Stephen Paul Corbett (born August 11, 1951) is a former American football offensive guard who played one season for the New England Patriots in 1975. He was drafted in the 2nd round (30) in the 1974 NFL Draft. He retired in 1976 because of injuries but attempted a comeback in 1978 and in 1979.

References

Further reading

Living people
1951 births
American football offensive guards
Players of American football from New Hampshire
New England Patriots players
Boston College Eagles football players
People from Dover, New Hampshire
Sportspeople from Strafford County, New Hampshire